The 1973 Canadian Indoor Championships was a men's tennis tournament played on indoor hard courts that was part of the 1973 USLTA Indoor Circuit and took place at the Glenmore Racquet Club in Calgary, Alberta in Canada. It was the inaugural edition of the tournament and was held from 12 February through 17 February 1973. First-seeded Ilie Năstase won the singles title which earned him $3,000 first-prize money.

Finals

Singles
 Ilie Năstase defeated  Paul Gerken 6–4, 7–6(5–4)
 It was Năstase's 2nd singles title of the year and the 26th of his career.

Doubles
 Mike Estep /  Ilie Năstase defeated  Szabolcs Baranyi /  Péter Szőke 6–7, 7–5, 6–3

References

External links
 ATP tournament profile
 ITF tournament edition details

Canadian Indoor Championships
Canadian Indoor Championships
November 1973 sports events in Canada